Linacre is a word deriving from Middle English līn ('flax') and aker ('field'), thus originally denoting places associated with a flax-field. It is also found as a surname originating as a name given to people from places called Linacre.

Linacre (surname), including a list of people with the name
Linacre College, postgraduate college of Oxford University
Linacre, an area west of Chesterfield, Derbyshire, England
Linacre, the central area of Bootle (formerly known as Bootle-cum-Linacre), Merseyside, England
Linacre (ward), an electoral ward of the Sefton Metropolitan Borough Council

References